Sagebrush Law is a 1943 American Western film directed by Sam Nelson and starring Tim Holt (The Magnificent Ambersons, The Treasure of the Sierra Madre) and Cliff Edwards (perhaps best known as the original voice of Disney's Jiminy Cricket).

It is one of Holt's least regarded Westerns although the fight scene on top of the stage coach is highly regarded. It was one of six films Holt made in two months before going into the United States Army Air Forces as a B-29 bombardier during World War II.

Plot summary
Cowboy Tom Weston and his friend Ike ride anonymously into town. Upon arrival, they discover that Weston's father, the town's banker, is dead. The bank's surviving partner, Mark Carter, and a purported bank examiner named Landers have convinced the townspeople the death was a suicide. Carter and Landers also claim that Weston's father had embezzled most of the town's money from the now insolvent bank.

A suspicious Weston, aware that his left-handed father was found with a gun in his right hand, begins investigating. Carter reveals Weston's true identity prompting angry townspeople to chase Weston and Ike out of town. During their escape Weston and Ike discover a gunshot victim on the outskirts of town. Weston and Ike learn that wounded man is the real bank examiner, bolstering their suspicions of foul play. The pair return to town in a race to identify the murderer(s) before they can escape from justice with the town's money.

Cast

References

External list
 
 
 
 

1943 films
American Western (genre) films
1943 Western (genre) films
Films produced by Bert Gilroy
Films directed by Sam Nelson
RKO Pictures films
American black-and-white films
Films scored by Paul Sawtell
1940s American films